Balakovo Airport  is an airport in Russia located 19 km south of Balakovo.  It is a civilian airport servicing medium-sized airliners up to Tu-154 and Il-76 size.

References

 Balakovo Air Enterprise, Balakovo Airport, Saratov Region. Worldhistory.biz. Accessed September 2015.

Airports built in the Soviet Union
Airports in Saratov Oblast